Vinicius Julianetti Evandro, known as Vinicius Evandro (born April 23, 1987) is a Brazilian professional football player. Currently, he plays for Brusque Futebol Clube.

He played on the professional level in Ligue 2 for Tours FC and Zob Ahan in Iran Pro League.

Club career

Club Career Statistics

Last update:  1 Feb 2010 

 Assist Goals

1987 births
Living people
Brazilian footballers
Brazilian expatriate footballers
Expatriate footballers in France
Ligue 2 players
Joinville Esporte Clube players
Tours FC players
Rodez AF players
Brusque Futebol Clube players
Association football defenders